Reginald Hugh Durning Sellers  (born 20 August 1940) is a former Test cricketer (Australian test cap 230). He was the second Indian-born cricketer to have played a Test match for Australia.

Family
The son of William Alfred Durning Sellers (1907-2005), and Irene Ethel Sellers (1915-2005), née Fremantle, Reginald Hugh Durning Sellers was born at Bulsar, now Valsad, in Gujarat, India on 20 August 1940.

Sellers is married to Ann and has three sons. His brother Basil Sellers is a businessman and philanthropist.

Education
Having migrated with his family to Australia in early 1948, and from the connexion with Cecil Charles Shinkfield (1891-1973), then the headmaster of King's College, Adelaide, established aboard RMS Strathaird during their voyage to Australia the two brothers attended King's College.

Cricket
A tall leg-spinner, and affectionately known as "Sahib" in cricket circles, he played one Test match for Australia in India, in October 1964, in which he was bowled for a duck, took one catch and bowled five overs for 17 runs without taking a wicket.

His playing career was severely restricted when cysts developed under a tendon attached to his spinning finger; although he did return to the South Australian Cricket team as a batsman, where he made his highest score  87, caught Ian Brayshaw, bowled Tony Lock  in his last innings, in the January 1967 match in Perth against Western Australia.

Cricket administrator
He retired after the 1966–67 season. However Sellers has had a long career serving the South Australian Cricket Association (SACA) in both selection and administrative roles, was on the board of the Les Favell foundation and was made a life member of the SACA.

2013 Australia Day Honours
He was awarded the Medal of the Order of Australia in the 2013 Australia Day Honours, for "service to the sport of cricket, particularly as an administrator."

Notes

References
 Dhole, Pradip (2016), "Rex Sellers: First-Anglo Indian to play for Australia", Cricket Country, 16 September 2016.
 Skene, Patrick. (2016), "The Forgotten Story of ... Rex Sellers, the Indian-Australian leg-spinner, The Guardian, Tuesday, 12 January 2016.
 D400, SA1964/1238: Certificate of Registration as an Australian Citizen No.C(1)21780: Reginald Hugh Durning Sellers, National Archives of Australia.

External links

1940 births
People from Valsad district
Anglo-Indian people
Indian emigrants to Australia
Australian people of Anglo-Indian descent
Australian sportspeople of Indian descent
Australian cricketers
Australia Test cricketers
Australian cricket administrators
Kensington cricketers
Living people
People educated at Pembroke School, Adelaide
Recipients of the Medal of the Order of Australia
South Australia cricketers